Fernando Oliveira may refer to:

 Fernando Olivera (politician) (born 1958), Peruvian politician
 Fernando Olivera (footballer) (born 1998), Uruguayan footballer

See also
 Fernanda Oliveira (disambiguation)
 Fernando Oliveira (born 1984), Brazilian footballer